Mordellaria hesei is a species of beetle in the genus Mordellaria of the family Mordellidae. It was described in 1965.

References

Beetles described in 1965
Mordellidae